Pierre Allain (7 January 1904 – 19 December 2000) was a French alpinist who began climbing in the 1920s. In the 1930s he was joined by several others at Fontainebleau, where his group of "'Bleausards" developed a love of bouldering that went beyond simple training for the Alps. The famous Allain Angle (V2 - V3), done in 1934, is a testament to their dedication and to the resulting elevation of standards. In Allain's 1949 book, Alpinisme et Competition, he expresses his appreciation of this simple and understated climbing specialty.

To facilitate the rock-climbing experience he developed – in the 1930s - the first rubber-soled, soft shoes specifically engineered for serious rock work. He wore these on the sandstone boulders as well as on the granite walls of the Alps, where he made several famous first ascents, including the north face of the Aiguille du Dru. These shoes, known as "PAs", became the model for future generations of climbing footwear. Indeed, the version available in the 1950s looked remarkably like modern climbing footwear.

In the 1950s Allain opened a mountaineering store in Paris, where, among other innovative items, he offered the first modern alloy carabiners. Prior to that time, these indispensable snaplinks were made of heavy steel. His brand name then became "EB", out of his associate's name Edmond Bourdonneau who purchased the store from him in 1950, and now when Allain's name comes up these days, it is more frequently in connection with his pioneering bouldering efforts at Fontainebleau.

References

French rock climbers
French mountain climbers
1904 births
2000 deaths
Sportspeople from Fontainebleau